"Potential" is the twelfth episode of the seventh and final season of the television show Buffy the Vampire Slayer.

Plot
Two Potential Slayers, Rona and Vi, walk alone in the cemetery until Spike knocks Rona out of the way, grabs Vi and leans in for the kill. Buffy and the other Slayers watch and learn from this example and Buffy lectures the girls on how to deal with vampire attacks. Buffy has Spike attack her to continue, but she easily gets the upper hand and pins Spike to the ground, reawakening some of his wounds and some feelings for both of them. In the Summers basement, Buffy reminds the Potentials about the seriousness of death. They believe the First is taking a brief break from them, but it will come back stronger and better than before. While Dawn watches silently from the stairs, Buffy tries to give the girls another pep talk.

At work, Buffy talks with Xander on the phone until a student, Amanda, comes in for counseling. The girl asks about liking a boy who picks on her and seeks Buffy's advice, but Buffy gets a bit distracted with her own similar situation with Spike and rambles about how she is not going to let that problem happen again. Buffy returns home to bickering amongst the Potential Slayers and news from Willow that another Potential Slayer has been found, already in Sunnydale. The Potentials examine weapons and Dawn tries to fit into the group's conversation, but it is a struggle. Spike arrives and then leaves with Buffy and the other girls for some training. Andrew pouts because he is not invited and although silent, Dawn feels left out as well.

Willow prepares the ingredients for a spell that will locate the Potential Slayer and surround her with a glowing aura. The spell is performed at the fireplace, but at first it does not succeed, just creates a horrible smell. Dawn tries to open a door to air out the room, but the light follows her, knocking her into the door and surrounding her. Dawn starts to freak out at the news that she could be the latest Potential Slayer, and is worried that this would mean her sister would have to die first. Dawn does not want to tell Buffy what is going on and goes upstairs to think alone while the rest of the gang debate the pros and cons of the situation and telling Buffy. Dawn overhears the conversation and feeling the weight of their concerns and her potential fate of death, she sneaks out the window.

Buffy and Spike take the girls to a demon bar to explain the art of getting information out of the demonic patrons there. They run into Clem and after a brief happy exchange with him, Buffy secretly asks him to scare the overly confident Potentials. His face expands into a mass of snakelike limbs and such, making the girls scream and Spike laugh. While walking alone outside, Dawn runs into Amanda who has a scratch on her head and claims to have been attacked by a vampire. The girl explains that she got away and locked the vampire in one of the classrooms. Having heard rumors about Buffy, Amanda was going to ask for her help, but Dawn volunteers to take care of the problem.

Dawn and Amanda break back into the school, but when they reach the classroom, they find the door unlocked and do not see the vampire hiding wedged against the ceiling. The vampire falls as the girls try to leave and it chases them out into the halls until they reach locked doors. Trapped, Dawn turns to a fire extinguisher and when she cannot get it to work, she knocks the vampire around with it instead then bolts with Amanda. Buffy and Spike show the girls a crypt and teach them about the living quarters of vampires. While investigating the area, the girls find a dead body, but Buffy shows them that it is a vampire.

At the school, Dawn and Amanda hide in a classroom and push a set of drawers against the door while Dawn prepares for a plan of escape. Buffy tosses the vampire around while lecturing the girls about successful fighting and keeping a straight head during battle. Meanwhile, Dawn puts Buffy's lessons to use and acts resourcefully until the vampire pins her to the ground and goes in for the bite. The Bringers then suddenly break in through the windows and grab Amanda instead of Dawn. After beating up the vampire a bit, Buffy drops her stake and along with Spike, she leaves the girls trapped alone with the vampire. Back at the house, Willow, Xander and Anya find that Dawn has bolted and Willow rushes to do a spell to find her before it is too late.

Dawn uses the room's chemistry supplies to set the Bringers on fire and escape with Amanda. She realizes that Amanda is the true Potential Slayer and willingly hands over the right and her weapon to Amanda. The frightened teen has a hard time grasping these strange realities Dawn explains, but she does not have much time to think about it. Xander arrives at the school with Buffy and Spike as the Bringers attack full force. Amanda keeps the Bringers at bay and stakes the vampire that attacked her earlier while Buffy and Spike finish off the Bringers. As Amanda rambles to Buffy about the strangeness she is dealing with, Dawn reveals that Amanda was standing outside the front door when she was hit by the aura cloud from Willow's spell.

Amanda and the other Potential Slayers talk and bond about their successes with fighting the forces of darkness while Dawn secretly watches from the other room. Buffy checks in with Dawn, but she does not pick up on Dawn's real problem. While Buffy takes the other girls down to the basement for training, Xander catches on to Dawn's disappointment about not being a Potential. Xander confides in her how hard it is for him to be the powerless member of the gang and he relates to Dawn's pain. He reminds her that she does not need to be special with powers as she is "extraordinary" just the way she is. In return, Dawn suggests that he does have a power – his ability to notice what is really going on with the people he loves, despite the barriers.

References

External links

 

Buffy the Vampire Slayer (season 7) episodes
2003 American television episodes